A needle gun is a military breechloading rifle, named after its firing pin.

Needle gun or needlegun may also refer to:

 Needlegun, a firearm that fires small fin-stabilized metal darts
 Needlegun scaler, a hydraulic or pneumatic tool used to remove rust and paint
 "Needle Gun", a song by Hawkwind from their 1985 album The Chronicle of the Black Sword
 "Needle-Gun", a song by Ciccone Youth from their 1988 album The Whitey Album
 The Needler, a weapon from the Halo franchise; see

See also 
 Dart gun (disambiguation)
 Needle (disambiguation)